Joanna van de Winkel is a South African road bicycle racer. She competed at the 2012 Summer Olympics in the Women's road race.

References

South African female cyclists
Afrikaner people
Living people
Olympic cyclists of South Africa
Cyclists at the 2012 Summer Olympics
South African people of Dutch descent
Year of birth missing (living people)
Competitors at the 2019 African Games
African Games competitors for South Africa